Hannah Amuchechi Rueben (born 14 February 1994) is a Nigerian freestyle wrestler. She won the silver medal in the women's 76 kg event at the 2022 Commonwealth Games held in Birmingham, England. At the 2016 Summer Olympics in Rio de Janeiro, Brazil, she competed in the Women's freestyle -69 kg.

In 2020, she won the gold medal in the women's freestyle 65 kg event at the 2020 African Wrestling Championships.

She won the silver medal in her event at the 2022 African Wrestling Championships held in El Jadida, Morocco.

References

External links
 

Olympic wrestlers of Nigeria
1994 births
Wrestlers at the 2016 Summer Olympics
Living people
Commonwealth Games medallists in wrestling
Commonwealth Games silver medallists for Nigeria
Commonwealth Games bronze medallists for Nigeria
Wrestlers at the 2014 Commonwealth Games
Wrestlers at the 2022 Commonwealth Games
African Games silver medalists for Nigeria
African Games medalists in wrestling
Competitors at the 2015 African Games
African Wrestling Championships medalists
21st-century Nigerian women
Medallists at the 2014 Commonwealth Games
Medallists at the 2022 Commonwealth Games